Michael Robin Verrips (born 3 December 1996) is a Dutch professional footballer who plays as a goalkeeper for Eredivisie side Groningen, on loan from Fortuna Sittard.

Club career
Verrips began playing youth football for Vitesse. In 2011 he moved to PSV, where he rose through the youth teams in his two years at the club.

After leaving PSV, Verrips signed a one-year deal with FC Twente where, after a season in the youth team, he signed his first professional contract in 2014. However, having played no first team games for Twente, he joined Eredivisie side Sparta Rotterdam.

During his first season at Sparta Rotterdam, Verrips made appearances mainly for the second team, Jong Sparta. He made his Eredivisie debut for Sparta Rotterdam on 14 May 2017 in a game against Go Ahead Eagles. At the beginning of the 2017–18 season, Verrips signed on loan for Maastricht. Here he finally made a breakthrough, playing all 38 league games, one KNVB Cup match against AZ, and the club's two unsuccessful play-off games against Almere City. Verrips returned to Sparta Rotterdam at the end of the season.

On 1 July 2018, Verrips joined KV Mechelen where in July 2019 he unilaterally terminated his contract due to the conviction for match-fixing.

On 8 August 2019, he joined newly promoted Premier League club Sheffield United on a four-year deal.

On 1 February 2021, Verrips joined Eredivisie side FC Emmen on loan for the remainder of the 2020-21 season.

On 11 January 2022, Verrips joined Eredivisie side Fortuna Sittard on loan for the remainder of the 2021–22 season, with the option to buy Verrips in the summer.

At the end of the season, Fortuna Sittard exercised the purchase option and signed a three-year contract with Verrips, and then loaned him to Groningen for the 2022–23 season, with an option to buy.

International career
Verrips has represented the Netherlands at both under-19 and under-20 level.

Career statistics

Honours
Mechelen
 Belgian Cup: 2018–19

References

External links
 

1996 births
People from Rheden
Living people
Dutch footballers
Netherlands youth international footballers
Sparta Rotterdam players
MVV Maastricht players
K.V. Mechelen players
Sheffield United F.C. players
FC Emmen players
Fortuna Sittard players
FC Groningen players
Association football goalkeepers
Tweede Divisie players
Eredivisie players
Eerste Divisie players
Challenger Pro League players
English Football League players
Dutch expatriate footballers
Expatriate footballers in Belgium
Dutch expatriate sportspeople in Belgium
Expatriate footballers in England
Dutch expatriate sportspeople in England
Footballers from Gelderland